Mehboob Mitha is a Pakistani film released on 12 November 1971. It was directed by A. Q. Pirzada, produced by G. S. Gurnani (Jhulelal Films) and starred Anila Niyaz and Mushtaq Changezi.

See also
 Sindhi cinema
 List of Sindhi-language films

Further reading
 Gazdar, Mushtaq. 1997. Pakistan Cinema, 1947-1997. Karachi: Oxford University Press.
Sindhi-language films
Pakistani drama films
1971 films

References 
References